Alexander Harutyuni Bekzadyan (1879  August 1, 1938) was a Bolshevik revolutionary and Soviet statesman of Armenian descent. After serving as Soviet ambassador to Norway and Hungary he was murdered during the Great Purge.

Early years
Alexander Harutyunyi (Artemi) Bekzadian was born in 1879 in Shushi, Nagorno-Karabakh, Russian Empire. He graduated from Shushi Real School. In 1900-1902 he studied at the Kyiv Polytechnic Institute. In 1911, he graduated from the Faculty of Public Policy at the University of Zurich. 

He was arrested in Russia as a member of the Baku and Transcaucasian Committees of the Bolshevik party but escaped in 1906. Bekzadyan participated in several conferences of the Russian Social Democratic Labour Party in Europe and Russia and maintained close contact with the figures of the 2nd International from European parties. In 1914, he worked in Baku, then in the North Caucasus.

Soviet career
In 1920-21 he served as deputy chairman of the Revolutionary Committee of Armenia and as the first People's Commissar of Foreign Affairs of Armenian Soviet Socialist Republic. In December 1920 and January 1921, he sent notes to the Turkish government, demanding an end to atrocities against the Armenian population in the occupied Armenian territories, proposing to start negotiations for the return of Kars and Alexandropol to Soviet Armenia.

From 1926 to 1930 he was deputy chairman of the government of the Transcaucasian Soviet Federative Republic and People's Commissar of Trade. Bekzadyan served as the ambassador of the USSR in Norway (1930-1934) and then Hungary (1934–37).

Arrest, execution, and rehabilitation
On November 21, 1937, during the Great Purge, he was arrested and on charges of counter-revolutionary activities and was sentenced to death by the Military Collegium of the USSR Supreme Court. On August 1, 1938, the sentence was carried out at the Kommunarka shooting ground. Bekzadyan was posthumously rehabilitated in 1956.

References 

1879 births
1938 deaths
Armenian revolutionaries
Politicians from Shusha
People from Elizavetpol Governorate
University of Zurich alumni
Russian Social Democratic Labour Party members
Old Bolsheviks
Communist Party of Armenia (Soviet Union) politicians
Armenian atheists
Ambassadors of the Soviet Union to Norway
Ambassadors of the Soviet Union to Hungary
Great Purge victims from Armenia
Soviet rehabilitations
Members of the Communist Party of the Soviet Union executed by the Soviet Union